MV Red Eagle is a Raptor-class vehicle and passenger ferry operated by Red Funnel on their route from Southampton to East Cowes on the Isle of Wight. The largest of its class, Red Eagle is the current flagship for Red Funnel.

History
Between October and December 2004 she underwent modifications by Remontowa in Gdańsk, Poland, in order to increase vehicle capacity by 80 and allow a greater passenger capacity. She was the last of Red Funnel's Raptor-class ships to undergo the process. When she re-entered service in January 2005, she became the largest vessel regularly crossing the Solent, taking this title from her sister, Red Osprey. Prior to beginning her 2018 sailing season, Red Eagle underwent a refit at Southampton Marine Services that refurbished and expanded her interior spaces. Fabrication work for the new extensions was by Wight Shipyard.

Events
On 27 September 2018 it was reported that the vessel had cut three yachts adrift from their moorings during thick fog. A catamaran and a channel marker were struck during the incident in Cowes harbour, after which two yachts were found drifting outside the harbour.

On 11 November 2008 she was used on an excursion to view Queen Elizabeth 2 leaving Southampton for the final time.

Appearances in media
She featured in an episode of Top Gear in 2002, as part of a review of an Aston Martin.  She is featured in the 2008 video game Ship Simulator 2008, along with one of her running mates, Red Jet 4, as a sailable ship.

References

External links 

 

Ferries of England
Ferry transport on the Isle of Wight
1996 ships
Ships of Red Funnel